The 2014-15 season will be the 24th season of competitive association football in Azerbaijan.

Promotion and relegation

Pre-season

National teams

UEFA Euro 2016 qualifying

International Friendlies

League season

Premier League

First Division

References

External links
 pfl.az
 AFFA